Gabriel Bezák (born 24 April 1993) is a Slovak football forward.

Club career

AS Trenčín
He grew up in hometown AS Trenčín. In the 2011/2012 season of Slovak junior league, he scored 18 goals for AS Trenčín junior team. On 20 June 2012, he signed his first three-year professional contract with AS Trenčín. Bezák made his debut for FK AS Trenčín against FC ViOn Zlaté Moravce on 17 September 2013, entering in as a substitute in place of Tomáš Malec.

External links
 AS Trenčín profile 
 Corgoň Liga profile

References

1993 births
Living people
Slovak footballers
Slovakia youth international footballers
Association football forwards
AS Trenčín players
Slovak Super Liga players